Jacques Prost, born in 1946 in Bourg-en-Bresse, is a French physicist, former General director of École supérieure de physique et de chimie industrielles de la ville de Paris, member of the French Academy of Sciences.

Alumni of the École normale supérieure de Saint-Cloud (sciences) (1965), Jacques Prost studied at Harvard University and founded and head (1987–1995) the "Theoretical Physico-Chemistry" Group of the ESPCI ParisTech under the direction of Pierre-Gilles de Gennes. His group studied liquid crystal and soft matter properties. In 1996, he founded the group "Physical Chemistry Curie" lab at the Curie Institute (Paris). His group studies physical approaches to biological problems and describes cell motion, molecular motors, the properties of biological membranes and protein adhesion.

Jacques Prost was the scientific advisor to Elf Aquitaine from 1990 to 1999. He is a member of the French Academy of Sciences since 2007. Jacques Prost has been the General director of ESPCI ParisTech, since 2003.

References 

People from Bourg-en-Bresse
1946 births
French physicists
Members of the French Academy of Sciences
Harvard University alumni
Living people
Academic staff of ESPCI Paris
Knights of the Ordre national du Mérite